Nova Twins are an English rock duo formed in London, England, in 2014, consisting of vocalist/guitarist Amy Love and bassist Georgia South. Their most recent album, Supernova, was released in June 2022.

Career

Love and South have been close friends since childhood and have played in bands that were often booked on the same bill. Both of them come from a mixed background; Love is of Iranian and Nigerian descent, and South is of Jamaican and Australian descent. (Georgia South's father, William South, is also a musician). They formed a band together in 2014 named BRAATS, releasing the song "Bad Bitches" under that name. Later that year they settled on the name Nova Twins, and released their first song "Bassline Bitch" under that name, in April 2015. That song attracted the attention of independent label Robotunes, which signed them and released their first self-titled EP in 2016.

After a show at French festival Rencontres Trans Musicales in December 2016, Nova Twins spent most of 2017 touring multiple countries and supported Prophets of Rage, after which Tom Morello named them "the best band you've never heard of". They have since supported Wolf Alice, Little Simz, Dream Wife, Black Honey, Enter Shikari, and Skunk Anansie. In 2017 they self-released the singles "Thelma & Louise" and "Mood Swings", and started their own custom clothing line called Bad Stitches.

In 2018, Nova Twins self-released the singles "Hit Girl" and "Lose Your Head". They continued to tour with shows in Europe and America, including an appearance at the Afropunk festival in Brooklyn. Towards the end of that year they started recording their debut album with producer Jim Abbiss. In 2019, they toured with Fever 333 and again Prophets of Rage. The singles "Devil's Face" and "Vortex" from their upcoming album were released with accompanying music videos. They also collaborated with several brands, including Dr Martens on a global campaign, contributing both music and visuals. It was revealed later in the year that they had been signed to Fever 333's label 333 Wreckords Crew.

Their debut album Who Are the Girls? was released on February 28, 2020. Who Are the Girls? received positive reviews at Kerrang!, Crash, and elsewhere. The band won Best U.K. Breakthrough Band in the 2020 Heavy Music Awards. Their second album Supernova was released on June 17, 2022. Supernova was shortlisted for the 2022 Mercury Prize.

Musical style
Nova Twins have been described by The Guardian as a "bass-heavy duo fusing grime and punk", and by themselves as "urban punk". PRS for Music called them "a genre bending amalgamation of raw punk energy, illegal rave electronics and unapologetic grimey attitude."

Members
Amy Love – lead vocals, guitar
Georgia South – bass guitar, keyboards, backing vocals

Discography

Albums
 Who Are the Girls? (2020)
 Supernova (2022)

EPs
 Nova Twins EP (2016)
 Thelma and Louise EP (2017)
 Mood Swings EP (2017)

Singles
 "Hit Girl" (2018)
 "Mood Swings" (2018)
 "Lose Your Head" (2018)
 "Devil's Face" (2019)
 "Vortex" (2019)
 "Taxi" (2020)
 "Play Fair" (2020)
 "Antagonist" (2021)
 "K.M.B." (2022)
 "Cleopatra" (2022)
 "Puzzles" (2022)
 "Choose Your Fighter" (2022)

Features
 Vibrations EP (2017) – "Vibrations – Remix" – Koder
 Unpaintable EP (2020) – "Flitch" – Tsar B
 Flitch EP (2020) – "Flitch" – Tsar B
 Post Human: Survival Horror (2020) – "1x1" – Bring Me the Horizon

Awards and nominations

References

External links
 
 NME interview, 2020

British alternative rock groups
Rap rock groups
English alternative rock groups
British nu metal musical groups
English punk rock groups
Musical groups established in 2014
Rock music duos
Musical groups from London